Toranja is a Portuguese rock band with a flair for lyrics with a rebellious tone. Their first album "Esquissos" was greeted with some acclaim in Portugal. "Segundo" is the title of their second album ("Segundo" means "second" in Portuguese) – which established Toranja as one of the relevant names of the new generation of Portuguese bands at the time. The band paused their activities in 2006, for undetermined time. However, its musicians are still in the music scene, each one with their own projects.

At the beginning of her career, the faddist Cuca Roseta was a singer in Toranja, invited by her childhood friend Tiago Bettencourt.

Members
Tiago Bettencourt: vocals and guitar
Ricardo Frutoso: guitar
Dodi: bass
Rato: drums

References

Portuguese rock music groups